Länggrien (also known as Aareinseli) is an island in the River Aare, located in the canton of Solothurn, Switzerland. The island has a maximum length of 600 metres and a maximum width of 270 metres. Its highest point is 428 metres above sea level, a few metres above the river level. The minimum distance from the shore is about 50 metres.

Politically the island belongs to the municipality of Selzach in the district of Lebern.

References
Swisstopo topographic maps

External links
Länggrien on MySwitzerland.com

River islands of Switzerland
Landforms of the canton of Solothurn
Aare